Sugar Man or The Sugar Man may refer to:

Music
Stanley Turrentine, a jazz saxophonist also known as 'The Sugar Man'
The Sugar Man, an album by the above artist
Cootie Stark, a guitarist and singer-songwriter also known as 'Sugar Man'
Sugar Man, an album by the above artist
"Sugar Man", a song by US folk musician Rodriguez from the album Cold Fact and remixed in 2014 by Yolanda Be Cool and DCUP
Sugarman: The Best of Rodriguez, a compilation album by Rodriguez 
Searching for Sugar Man, a documentary film about Rodriguez
Sugar Man, an EP by Silent Poets
"Sugar Man", a song by Roy Orbison
"Sugar Man", a song by The Reverend Peyton's Big Damn Band
"Sugar Man", a song by Bill Kenwright
"Sugar Man", a song from the album Dollars and Sex by The Escape Club
"Sugar Man", a song from the album Jesus Was a Capricorn by Kris Kristofferson
"Sugar Man", a song from the single "Last Request" by Paolo Nutini
"Sugar Man (9 To 5)", a song by Bobby Darin
"Sugar Man's Blues", a song from the album There Will Be Peace in the Valley... When We Get the Keys to the Mansion on the Hill by Alabama 3
"Vendetta: The Sugar Man", a song from the album The John Baker Tapes – Volume One: BBC Radiophonics by John Baker

Other uses
Sugar Man, a villain appearing in the Marvel comic universe
SMS Sugar Man, a film by Aryan Kaganof
Two Yoo Project - Sugar Man, a South Korean TV series
Riddick Bowe, a US boxer also known as 'Sugar Man'

See also
Sugarman
Sugar daddy (disambiguation)